Taoyuan City Constituency IV includes most of Taoyuan District in Taoyuan City. The district was formerly known as Taoyuan County Constituency IV (2008-2014) and was created in 2008, when all local constituencies of the Legislative Yuan were reorganized to become single-member districts.

Current district
 Taoyuan:
urban villages (66 in total): Zhonglu(中路里), Tong'an(同安里), Fu'an(福安里), Zhongning(中寧里), Chenggong(成功里), Xinguang(信光里),Fulin(福林里), Zhongde(中德里), Ziqiang(自強里), Nanmen(南門里), Longshan(龍山里), Dalin(大林里), Dashu(大樹里), Zhongxing(中興里),Ximen(西門里), Nanpu(南埔里), Long'an(龍安里), Wenzhong(文中里), Xipu(西埔里), Nanhua(南華里),  Longgang(龍岡里), Dafeng(大豐里), Wenhua(文化里), Xihu(西湖里),Jianguo(建國里), Longxiang(龍祥里), Zhongshan(中山里), Wenchang(文昌里), Longfeng(龍鳳里), Zhongping(中平里), Wenming(文明里),Taishan(泰山里), Fenglin(豐林里), Zhongzheng(中正里), Beimen(北門里), Dongshan(東山里), Zhuangjing(莊敬里), Zhongcheng(中成里), Beipu(北埔里), Dongmen(東門里), Zhaoyang(朝陽里), Baoqing(寶慶里), Zhonghe(中和里), Minsheng(民生里), Dongpu(東埔里), Yunlin(雲林里),Zhongxin(中信里), Yong'an(永安里), Wuling(武陵里), Ciwen(慈文里), Zhongyuan(中原里), Yingxing(永興里), Chang'an(長安里), Xinpu(新埔里), Zhongpu(中埔里), Yushan(玉山里), Changmei(長美里),Zhongtai(中泰里), Guangxing(光興里), Changde(長德里), Tongde(同德里), Mingde(明德里), Ruiqing(瑞慶里), Bao'an(寶安里), Zhongsheng(中聖里), Longshou(龍壽里)

Legislators

Election results

 

 
 
 
 
 
 

Constituencies in Taoyuan City